Emídio Dantas Barreto (1850-1931) was a Brazilian army marshal, military historian, journalist, novelist and playwright. He was born in Bom Conselho, and at the age of 15, enlisted as volunteer in the Paraguayan War. He was decorated for his service, and in 1868, he was promoted to officer. After the end of the war, he returned to Brazil and took an artillery course at the Military School in Rio de Janeiro. He took part in the Canudos campaign, where his efforts were crowned with promotion to Colonel. 

In 1910 he was promoted to Major General. He was Minister of War for Hermes da Fonseca. He resigned to take over the government of Pernambuco (1911-1915), being later elected senator for that state (1916-1918). He retired as Marshal of the Army in 1918.

Despite having important military and political responsibilities, Dantas Barreto also dedicated himself to literature, becoming known for his activities as a chronicler, novelist and playwright. He wrote for Revista Americana in Rio de Janeiro and Jornal do Comércio in Porto Alegre. He was the second occupant of chair 27 of the Brazilian Academy of Letters, to which he was elected in September 1910, succeeding Joaquim Nabuco. He was received by academician Carlos de Laet on January 7, 1911. The inaugural session took place at the Monroe Palace.

He died in Rio de Janeiro in 1931.

References

Brazilian writers
Brazilian military personnel
1850 births
1930 deaths